Thomas Lakin (1840–?) was a United States Navy sailor and a recipient of the United States military's highest decoration, the Medal of Honor.

Biography
Born in 1840 in New York, Lakin joined the Navy from that state. During that month, while Narragansett was at the Mare Island Naval Shipyard in California, he jumped overboard and rescued two shipmates from drowning. For this action, he was awarded the Medal of Honor.

Lakin's official Medal of Honor citation reads:
Serving on board the U.S.S. Narragansett at the Navy Yard, Mare Island, Calif., November 1874, jumping overboard, Lakin displayed gallant conduct by rescuing 2 men of that ship from drowning.

See also

List of Medal of Honor recipients in non-combat incidents

References

External links

1840 births
Year of death missing
Military personnel from New York (state)
United States Navy sailors
United States Navy Medal of Honor recipients
Non-combat recipients of the Medal of Honor